

Undergraduate Chapters & New Chapters
This is a list of chapters, active, new and inactive, of Delta Sigma Phi fraternity.

Undergraduate chapter and colony statistics
Since 1899, Delta Sigma Phi has issued 233 charters in 41 states (United States of America), Washington, D.C., and 3 provinces in Canada.  Currently, the Fraternity has active chapters and colonies in 32 states and Washington, D.C.  All three former chapters in Canada are dormant. States that have never had the presence of the Fraternity are Alaska, Delaware, Hawaii, Maine, Mississippi, New Hampshire, North Dakota, Vermont, West Virginia.

Alumni associations
There are 20 alumni associations throughout the United States. These are located in:
Atlanta, GA
Boston, MA
Charlotte, NC
Chicago, IL
Denver, CO
Detroit, MI
Houston, TX
Inland Empire, CA (Riverside and San Bernardino counties)
La Verne, CA
New York City, NY 
Orange County, CA
Phoenix, AZ
Portland, OR
Salt Lake City, UT
San Diego, CA
San Jose, CA (Silicon Valley)
San Francisco, CA (Bay Area)
St. Louis, MO
Raleigh / Durham, NC (Triangle Area)
Washington, DC

Notes

chapters
Lists of chapters of United States student societies by society